Patriarch Sophronius of Alexandria may refer to:

 Patriarch Sophronius I of Alexandria, ruled in 841–860
 Patriarch Sophronius II of Alexandria, Greek Patriarch of Alexandria in 941
 Patriarch Sophronius III of Alexandria, ruled in 1116–1171
 Patriarch Sophronius IV of Alexandria, ruled in 1870–1899 (same person than Sophronius III of Constantinople)